Acanthoclita iridorphna is a moth of the family Tortricidae first described by Edward Meyrick in 1936. It is found in Sri Lanka and Taiwan.

References 

Moths of Asia
Moths described in 1936
Thyrididae